The Battle of Junik was a battle fought during the Kosovo War between the ethnic Albanian paramilitary organization known as the Kosovo Liberation Army (KLA) and the security forces of the Federal Republic of Yugoslavia over the town of Junik in western Kosovo.

Junik was occupied by the KLA early in the war and became a centre of arms smuggling from northern Albania due to its strategic location. The town was besieged by the Yugoslav Army (VJ) and Ministry of Internal Affairs (MUP) on 28 July 1998, and was the site of intense clashes for nearly three weeks afterwards. On 16 August, it was stormed by the Special Anti-Terrorist Unit, the special operations component of the MUP, forcing the remaining KLA fighters to flee into the surrounding hills and forests.

Four MUP personnel and two VJ soldiers were killed in the battle, according to contemporary reports. The KLA suffered 13 fatalities. In addition, there were eight Kosovo Albanian civilian fatalities. An additional 12,000 Kosovo Albanian civilians were displaced. After Junik's fall, the United States expressed concern that government forces had planted landmines around the town. In direct response to the town's capture, the United Nations Security Council passed Resolution 1199 on 23 September 1998, calling for an end to hostilities in Kosovo.

Background
Following World War II, Kosovo was given the status of an autonomous province within the Socialist Republic of Serbia, one of six constitutional republics of the Socialist Federal Republic of Yugoslavia. After the death of Yugoslavia's long-time leader Josip Broz Tito in 1980, Yugoslavia's political system began to unravel. In 1989, Belgrade abolished self-rule in Kosovo, as well as Serbia's other  autonomous province, Vojvodina, as part of Serbian President Slobodan Milošević's "anti-bureaucratic revolution". Though inhabited predominantly by ethnic Albanians, Kosovo was of great historical and cultural significance to the Serbs.  Alarmed by their dwindling numbers, the province's Serbs began to fear they were being "squeezed out" by the Albanians. As soon as Kosovo's autonomy was abolished, a minority government run by Serbs and Montenegrins was appointed by Milošević to oversee the province, enforced by thousands of heavily armed paramilitaries from Serbia-proper. Albanian culture was systematically repressed and hundreds of thousands of Albanians working in state-owned companies lost their jobs.

In 1996, a ragtag group of Albanian nationalists calling themselves the Kosovo Liberation Army (KLA) began attacking the Yugoslav Army (VJ) and the Serbian Ministry of Internal Affairs (MUP) in Kosovo. Their goal was to separate the province from the rest of Yugoslavia, which following the secession of Slovenia, Croatia, Macedonia and Bosnia-Herzegovina in 1991–92, became a rump federation made up of Serbia and Montenegro. At first the KLA carried out hit-and-run attacks: 31 in 1996, 55 in 1997, and 66 in January and February 1998 alone. The group quickly gained popularity among young Kosovo Albanians, many of whom favoured a more aggressive approach and rejected the non-violent resistance of politician Ibrahim Rugova. The organization received a significant boost in 1997, when an armed uprising in neighbouring Albania led to thousands of weapons from the Albanian Army's depots being looted. Many of these weapons ended up in the hands of the KLA. The KLA also received substantial funds from its involvement in the drug trade. The group's popularity skyrocketed after the VJ and MUP attacked the compound of KLA leader Adem Jashari in March 1998, killing him, his closest associates and most of his extended family. The attack motivated thousands of young Kosovo Albanians to join the KLA, fueling the Kosovar uprising that eventually erupted in the spring of 1998.

Junik is a town in western Kosovo, bordering on Deçan to the north and Gjakova to the south. Following World War II, it became a municipality in its own right, but in 1962, it was dissolved and its territory divided between its neighbours. By 1998, Junik was mainly inhabited by Kosovo Albanians. The area was also home to approximately 700 Serbs. Junik was of great strategic importance because it was situated along the Košare valley corridor. This resulted in the town becoming the KLA's main conduit for weapons smuggling and distribution in western Kosovo early in the war. The area's mountainous terrain was also ideal for evading attacks by the VJ and MUP, and as a result, the KLA established its western Kosovo headquarters in the town. Junik was among the first towns caught up in the fighting between Yugoslavia's security forces and the KLA, becoming a flashpoint of the KLA's so-called First Offensive in April 1998. The attack on the Jashari compound prompted the West to re-impose sanctions against Yugoslavia, which had been lifted following the signing of the Dayton Agreement in early 1996. By mid-June, the KLA was claiming to be in control of 40 percent of Kosovo.

Battle
Clashes between the KLA and the Yugoslav authorities in and around Junik commenced on 29 May 1998. By the following month, virtually all of Junik's 7,000 inhabitants were displaced. An additional 5,000 Kosovo Albanians from the surrounding areas who had previously sought shelter in the town were also dislocated. Around this time, the Yugoslav Air Force carried out a number of airstrikes in Junik and its vicinity. The KLA was believed to be in control of approximately 40 percent of Kosovo by this point but was prone to losing newly seized land as quickly as it had acquired it. On 24 June, U.S. diplomat Richard Holbrooke visited Junik and met with KLA fighters there. He proposed declaring a ceasefire and having the warring sides work towards a negotiated settlement, but the KLA rejected the offer.

On 27 July, the VJ ambushed a column of fighters attempting to leave Junik and cross the Albanian–Yugoslav border, killing seven or eight people. The following day, the VJ surrounded the town. Its encirclement coincided with an almost simultaneous offensive that wrested from the KLA a nearby highway that had been held by the insurgents for two months. Before being placed back into operation, the highway had to be cleared of improvised explosive devices. The VJ and MUP gave the insurgents, as well as civilians trapped within the town, one hour to leave Junik via two corridors. But the deadline passed without any response. Around sunset, the security forces and the KLA began exchanging mortar fire. Some contemporary accounts suggest that Junik's encirclement resulted in 1,000 KLA fighters being trapped within the town. Other accounts place the figure around 1,500. Shortly after Junik's encirclement, Milošević spoke with a delegation of European Union representatives and offered to end the siege in exchange for international sanctions being lifted, but the two side's failed to reach an agreement.

For more than two weeks, the VJ/MUP and the KLA lobbed mortar shells at each other, and exchanged sporadic bursts of gunfire. On 16 August, after a siege lasting nearly 20 days, the VJ and MUP took control of Junik, forcing the insurgents to abandon their weapons and retreat to the surrounding hills and forests. The storming of the town was spearheaded by the Special Anti-Terrorist Unit, the special operations component of the MUP. The assault was accompanied by the extensive use of helicopters and tanks.

Aftermath
At the time of its capture, Junik was the last major KLA stronghold in Kosovo. MUP spokesman Božidar Filić said that with its fall, "the territory of Kosovo has been freed for movement in all directions." The loss of its last major stronghold did not result in the KLA's demise. Instead of completely destroying the organization, the VJ and MUP only forced the KLA to retreat to northern Albania, from where it was able to regroup and resume its insurgency. Nevertheless, the political analyst Corinna Metz notes that the loss of Junik resulted in the KLA losing its of aura of invincibility among the Kosovo Albanian population. According to contemporary reports, four MUP and two VJ personnel were killed in the battle. The Humanitarian Law Center, a Belgrade-based non-governmental organization, lists 13 guerrillas, eight Kosovo Albanian civilians, and two MUP personnel as being killed. Among the dead was the KLA commander in Junik, Bekim Berisha, as well as deputy KLA commanders Bedri Shala, Elton Zherka, and Përmet Vula. Filić said that there had been no civilian casualties because nearly all of the town's inhabitants had left before the battle. BBC News correspondent Jeremy Cooke described Junik's capture as "a major blow to the KLA". Western reporters who visited the town once fighting had stopped reported that the entire civilian population had fled. They found that some buildings had sustained heavy damage but most of the town remained intact.

Albanian Foreign Minister Paskal Milo condemned the town's encirclement and capture as an act of "genocide and mass repression". The Vice-Chancellor and Foreign Minister of Austria, Wolfgang Schuessel, also condemned the assault. Rugova stated that the town's fall would reduce the likelihood of peace negotiations taking place. Adem Demaçi, a prominent Kosovo Albanian activist, said that the offensive "proved there was no alternative to independence for Kosovo." Partly in response to the town's capture, on 17 August 1998, troops from 14 different NATO member states took part in military exercises in Albania, intended as a warning signal to the Yugoslav government. On 20 August, U.S. State Department spokesman James Rubin accused Yugoslavia's security forces of planting anti-personnel mines around Junik. Five days later, the United Nations High Commissioner for Refugees issued a statement confirming that the town's surroundings had been mined. In response to the battle, the United Nations Security Council passed Resolution 1199 on 23 September, calling for an end to hostilities in Kosovo.

References

1998 in Kosovo
August 1998 events in Europe
Junik
Junik
July 1998 events in Europe
Kosovo Liberation Army
Junik